is a railway station in Satoshō, Asakuchi District, Okayama Prefecture, Japan, operated by West Japan Railway Company (JR West).

Lines
Satoshō Station is served by the Sanyō Main Line.

Adjacent stations

|-
!colspan=5|JR West

See also
 List of railway stations in Japan

External links
  

Railway stations in Okayama Prefecture
Sanyō Main Line
Railway stations in Japan opened in 1920